Star Ruler is a space 4X / RTS hybrid developed and published by American company Blind Mind Studios.

It was released on August 21, 2010. The game was launched in retail outlets in the EU on August 16, 2011 via Iceberg Interactive and was planned to launch Mid-October in the US via Interactive Gaming Software (IGS). However this deal fell through and  never launched in retail outlets in the United States.

Gameplay 

 features a 1 to 10,000+ star system count galaxy of configurable shape.  The size of the in-game universe is only limited by the processing power of the user's computer. Generated systems may have orbiting planets, moons, asteroids, comets, or aggressive, capturable, NPC assets.
Gameplay occurs in a single space in real-time with the rate of time determined by the player.  also features Newtonian mechanics in its ship movement.

Key differences from other games of the genre are: Detailed unit creation, behavior, and automation customization, physically modeled star systems and orbiting bodies, and a lack of traditional maintenance and unit count cap game mechanics.

Ship building 

One of 's most impressive components is the ship construction. Each ship is built around a hull type. Different hulls will fulfil different purposes. For example, a Heavy hull is more resilient, but offers less space for components. A station hull is very resilient, and offers the most component space, but cannot mount engines. Each component can be scaled, and its effects scaled with it. For example, a 2.0 railgun will do half as much damage as a 4.0 railgun, which is the largest size, but will also consume half the power. Things like a bridge, life support, crew quarters, and power generators are necessary for most ships. The most unusual feature of 's ship building system is the ability to scale ships. It is possible to build everything from a near microscopic scout ship to colossal dreadnoughts that are larger than a star.

Sequel
A sequel Star Ruler 2 was announced on August 1, 2013 with a prospective launch date of late 2014.

References

External links 

Real-time strategy video games
2010 video games
4X video games
Video games developed in the United States
Windows games
Windows-only games
Video games with Steam Workshop support
Video games using procedural generation
Creative Commons-licensed video games